Charles Dullin (8 May 1885 – 11 December 1949) was a French actor, theater manager and director.

Career 
Dullin began his career as an actor in melodrama:185 In 1908, he started his first troupe with Saturnin Fabre, the Théâtre de Foire, where they staged works by Alexandre Arnoux.:185

Dullin at Vieux-Colombier 
Dullin was a student of Jacques Copeau,:317 whose company he joined in 1913 for one season, before rejoining from 1917 to 1918.:134 He also trained and worked with Jacques Rouché,:73 André Antoine and Firmin Gémier.

In June 1920, Dullin began taking on students and was giving acting lessons at the Théâtre Antoine under the tutelage of Gémier.:111

Théâtre de l'Atelier 
In July 1921, Dullin founded Théâtre de l'Atelier which he referred to as a "laboratory theater".:346 He conducted auditions for the troupe in Paris, and then brought the small group of actors to Néronville, where they trained for between ten and twelve hours daily. The small group of students, among them Antonin Artaud and Marguerite Jamois, was organised as a commune, with Dullin looking to create 'a different attitude toward theatre' through a 'common sharing of life and work'.

In 1922, the group established itself in the Théâtre Montmartre, the 'first purpose built theatre in suburban Paris', which originally opened in 1822.:31 In order to cover the initial cost of leasing and setting up the theatre, Dullin's mother sold some of the family's furniture and silverware at pawn shops.:36; :45

In 1941 he moved to the 'larger, more modern Théâtre Sarah-Bernhardt', where he remained resident until 1947 when accumulating debts forced him to close down.:78

Work on film 
Dullin also played many roles on the screen, and used some of the money earned in these roles to support his theater. He was one of the major French actors both on the stage and the screen during the 1930s.

Acting theory and techniques 
Dullin put a particular emphasis on mime, gymnastics, voice production, and various improvisational exercises intended to heighten one's sensory perception.:119 In the tradition of Copeau, Dullin emphasised respect for the text, a simplified stage décor and a poetic rather than a spectacular perspective on the mise-en-scène, placing the actor at the center of the performance.:76 He aimed to create a total theatre in which the world of the stage was 'more expressive than reality'.

The goal of Dullin's training was to create the "complete actor":to form actors with a general culture, which they so often lack; to inculcate them from the very beginning with solid principles of actors' techniques: good diction, physical training; to expand their means of expression to include dance and pantomime; in one word, to form the complete actor.The actor was to get in tune with "La Voix du Monde" (the voice of the world) by making contact with one's surroundings, which would free the actor's true voice, "Voix de Soi-Même" (the voice of oneself).:347

In his seminars, Dullin often used improvisation, which was one of his most important techniques. He emphasized that his actors must "see before describing, hear before answering...and feel before trying to express himself", often using bells, the sound of footsteps, and masks as preparation. His actors were encouraged to forget the weight of their bodies, while using them more than their faces to express themselves, often wearing a full or half mask.

East Asian influences 
Dullin drew heavily on East Asian theatre techniques, and particularly Japanese theatre,:135 His interest in Japanese theatre developed as early as 1916, when, as a soldier in World War 1, he performed on the frontline and declared his fellow soldier's performances to be Japanese due to their integration of dance, speech and singing into their performance.:134

As a member of Jacques Rouché's Théâtre des Arts (1910-1913) he performed in Louis Laloy's Le Chagrin dans le palais de Han (1911), an adaptation of a Chinese Yuan zaju play. He would first perform in the minor role of un seigneur before taking over the role the Emperor, one of the play's two leads, for its revival in December. In addition to starring in the revival, Rouché asked Dullin to modify some aspects of the staging, which, according to Rouché, foreshadowed his ‘future tendencies towards stylisation’:133

He would first witness Japanese theatre in 1930, when Tsutsui Tokujirō's troupe came to Paris.

Death 
Dullin died in Paris on December 11, 1949, after falling ill while on tour as an actor in Southern France.:90

Notable students
Students of Charles Dullin included Pascale de Boysson, Antonin Artaud, Jean-Louis Barrault,:29 Juozas Miltinis, Étienne Decroux, Juran Hisao and Marcel Marceau.

Notable productions

As director 

Ben Jonson's Volpone
Molière's L’Avare
Sophocles's Antigone in the Jean Cocteau adaptation with music by Arthur Honegger
Pirandello's The Pleasure of Honesty
Shakespeare's Richard III.

As actor 
 Âmes d'orient (1919) - Agapian
 The Secret of Rosette Lambert (1920) - Bertrand
 L'Homme qui vendit son âme au diable (1921) - Le Diable
 Le Miracle des loups (1924) - Le roi Louis XI
 Le Joueur d'échecs (1927) - Baron von Kempelen
 Misdeal (1928) - Olivier Maldone
 Cagliostro (1929) - Marquis de Espada-Comte de Breteil
 Les Misérables (1934) - Thénardier
 Street of Shadows (1937) - Le colonel Mathésius
 L'Affaire du courrier de Lyon (1937) - Le témoin aveugle
 Volpone (1941) - Corbaccio
 Le briseur de chaînes (1941) - Esprit Mouret
 Les jeux sont faits (1947) - Le marquis
 Quai des Orfèvres (1947) - Georges Brignon
 Vagabonds imaginaires (1950) - Le récitant (segment 'Les étoiles') (voice) (final film role)

References

External links
 
 

1885 births
1949 deaths
French male stage actors
French male film actors
French male silent film actors
20th-century French male actors
Actor-managers
People from Savoie
20th-century theatre managers